Hamlet. XXI Century is a 2009 four-episode television miniseries by Yuri Kara. It is an adaptation and modernization of William Shakespeare's tragedy Hamlet.

Plot
The plot of Shakespeare's drama is transferred to the screen with practically no changes, except for transferring the action to the 21st century. The wedding of Claudius and Gertrude takes place in a nightclub, Hamlet with Laertes compete in street racing on expensive cars, Rosencrantz and Guildenstern are outsiders and misfits.

The plot line is preserved - Claudius kills Hamlet's father, marries Gertrude, the father's ghost comes at night and in conversation with Hamlet reveals the details of his death. Hamlet is determined to avenge his father. During the performance of traveling artists an episode with a murder is added to the play "The Mousetrap", which infuriates Claudius.

Hamlet kills the eavesdropping and scheming Polonius, after which he tries to send him away from the country, and to blow him up on the way while on the yacht, however, his entourage, Rosencrantz with Guildenstern, die instead. Hamlet also returns to Elsinore, where he attends the funeral of Ophelia. Laertes, conspired by Claudius, is ready to avenge his father and sister. The duel of young people consists of street racing. Left after the competition on the faulty car, Hamlet stands the battle with Laertes, and, mourning his mother, Gertrude, who drank poisoned wine, gets a treacherous blow in the back from King Claudius. Gathering the last strength Hamlet stabs the sword in the back of the jubilant king.

Cast
Gela Meskhi — Prince Hamlet
Dmitri Dyuzhev — Claudius
Evgeniya Kryukova — Gertrude
Yulia Kara — Ophelia
Danila Kozlovsky — Laertes
Andrei Fomin — Polonius
Viktor Sukhorukov — Ozrik
Igor Lagutin — Ghost
Armen Dzhigarkhanyan — gravedigger
Alexander Berdnikov — Rosenkrantz
Ilya Obolonkov — Guildenstern
Dmitry Beroyev — Horatio
Dmitry Bozin — Actor
Elena Morozova — Actress

Further reading
 .

References

External links

Russian television films
Teen films based on works by William Shakespeare
Modern adaptations of works by William Shakespeare
Films based on Hamlet
2009 drama films
Russian television miniseries